William Ewart Humphrey (March 31, 1862 – February 14, 1934), an American politician, served as a member of the United States House of Representatives from 1903 to 1917. He represented the state of Washington at large from 1903 to 1909 and the First Congressional District of Washington from 1909 to 1917. Humphrey also served as a member of the Federal Trade Commission from 1925 to 1933.

Biography
Humphrey was born near Alamo, Indiana, and attended local common schools. He graduated from Wabash College in 1887 and then went on to study law. Humphrey was admitted to the Indiana State Bar in 1887,  and started a practice in Crawfordsville, Indiana. When the economic Panic of 1893 struck, he moved to Seattle, Washington, continuing to practice law.

Humphrey was elected as a Republican to fill Washington's new third seat in the House of Representatives in 1902. He was re-elected in 1904 and 1906 to this position. The seat was elected by the state at large until the election of 1908, when the three seats were divided into congressional districts. Humphrey's seat became the First Congressional District of Washington, with Humphrey winning the first election to the new District in 1908 and re-election in 1910, 1912, and 1914. He ran unsuccessfully for the Senate in 1916, which marked the end of his congressional career.

President Calvin Coolidge appointed Humphrey as a member of the Federal Trade Commission (FTC) in 1925, and he was reappointed for another six-year term in 1931. Because of policy disagreements, Humphrey was dismissed from the FTC by President Franklin D. Roosevelt in 1933. Humphrey, however, refused to recognize his dismissal, and brought a lawsuit in the United States Court of Claims to seek compensation for his continued employment, and legal questions from the lawsuit went (posthumously) before the United States Supreme Court in Humphrey's Executor v. United States, 295 U.S. 602 (1935), in which the Court ruled that Roosevelt's decision to terminate Humphrey violated an express limitation on presidential power set forth by Congress in the Federal Trade Commission Act.

Humphrey died from a hemorrhagic stroke in Washington, D.C. on February 14, 1934.

References

1862 births
1934 deaths
People from Montgomery County, Indiana
Wabash College alumni
Republican Party members of the United States House of Representatives from Washington (state)
Federal Trade Commission personnel
Coolidge administration personnel
Hoover administration personnel
Franklin D. Roosevelt administration personnel